Precious Memories is the thirty-sixth solo studio album by Dolly Parton. It was released on April 17, 1999, by Blue Eye Records. The album is sold exclusively at Dollywood and was released at the opening of the park's fourteenth season (1999–2000) with all proceeds going to the Dollywood Foundation.

Background
Parton performed many songs from the album on a TNN special, Dolly Parton's Precious Memories, that aired on April 1, 1999, as a part of TNN's 20th Century Hitmakers Week. The special also included performances by Alison Krauss and Union Station and the Cox Family. Parton's siblings Randy Parton and Rachel Dennison also appeared on the show.

Parton spoke in an interview about how close her roots in religion, family and music are, saying:

Track listing

Personnel
Adapted from the album liner notes.
Mark Brooks - bass
Danny Brown - engineer
Sam Bush - mandolin, fiddle
Gary Davis - acoustic guitar, banjo, electric guitar
Rachel Dennison - backing vocals
Bob Grundner - drums
Steven Hill - backing vocals
The Kinfolks  - backing vocals
The Kingdom Heirs  - backing vocals
Johnny Lauffer - piano, strings, organ
Gary Mackey - fiddle, mandolin
Liana Manis - backing vocals
Dave Matthews - recording, mixing
Richie Owens - producer
Jim Pace - additional recording overdubs
Dolly Parton - lead vocals, song arrangements
Randy Parton - backing vocals
Wade Perry - cover design
Darrell Puett - engineer
Al Perkins - steel guitar, dobro guitar, kona lap guitar

References

Dolly Parton albums
1999 albums